Jakob Blankenburg (born 5 August 1997) is a German politician of the Social Democratic Party (SPD) who has been serving as a member of the German Bundestag since 2021,  representing the Lüchow-Dannenberg – Lüneburg district.

Early life and education
From 2015 to 2021, Blankenburg studied political science at Leibniz University Hannover. During his studies, he did an internship with Lars Klingbeil.

Political career
In parliament, Blankenburg has been serving on the Committee on the Environment, Nature Conservation, Nuclear Safety and Consumer Protection and the Parliamentary Advisory Board on Sustainable Development.

Within his parliamentary group, Blankenburg belongs to the Parliamentary Left, a left-wing movement.

References

1997 births
Living people
Members of the Bundestag 2021–2025
Members of the Bundestag for the Social Democratic Party of Germany
21st-century German politicians

University of Hanover alumni